Metti Oli was an Indian Tamil-language soap opera that aired on weekdays on Sun TV for 811 episodes. The show starred Delhi Kumar, Kaveri, Gayathri, Vanaja, Uma, Chetan, Bose Venkat, Neelima Rani, Thirumurugan, Shanti Williams and Deepa Venkat. It was produced by Thiru Pictures S. Siddique, and written and directed by Thirumurugan. The serial has been followed by Muhurtham of Cine Times Entertainment.

Plot
The story is about Chidambaram, and about his 5 daughters, who faces various challenges in life.

Chidambaram is a real-estate broker from a small village called Azhagarkulam. He has 5 daughters, Dhanalakshmi (Dhanam), Saroja (Saro), Leelavathi (Leela), Vijayalakshmi (Viji) and Bhavani. The girls' mother had passed away and apart from them, their maternal uncle Bose stays with them as well. Chidambaram is a respected man in the village and his daughters love him. Saro and Bose have feelings for each other unknown to others. Soon proposals starts coming in for the Dhanam and Saro. A prospective groom for Dhanam comes to meet her. He is Manickam. Manickam has a younger brother Selvam and a younger sister Nirmala. All three of them were raised by their single-mother Rajam. Manickam is the most dearest to Rajam and he would do anything for her happiness. The reveal a shock that the eldest child from two families shouldn't marry, and that they want Saro as their daughter-in-law. Chidambaram agrees to Manickam – Saro wedding while Dhanam
's wedding is fixed with Bose. The two couples marry. Dhanam stays in Azhagarkulam while Saro moves to Chennai.

Manickam's house is a small rented house in the city. Rajam's true nature starts to be revealed and soon she starts to torture Saro. Manickam though loving towards her doesn't speak against his mother nor let anyone else to. Selvam is the only one in the house who truly cares for Saro's well-being. He sets up an astrologer who tricks Manickam and Rajam that if the mother-son duo stay together, Rajam's life would be at stake. Fearing this, Manickam moves to a compound house with Saro, with Rajam visiting him regularly. Leela and Selvam, who have been meeting regularly, fall in love.

Viji is the spoilt brat among the girls and is arrogant. She works as a nurse in a local clinic and gets acquainted with a man called Elango. Elango is a married man but hides the fact from Viji to cheat on her for his own pleasures. Despite warnings from Leela, Viji spends time with Elango and in turns of events, she marries him and loses her virginity. Very soon, she learns about his true colors. Saro, who is in Azhagarkulam at that time, fights with Elango's wife and she breaks her relation with him. Elango gets angry at Viji. He tries to kill Viji, only to get stabbed by Viji herself. Bose puts the blame on himself, but Elango's wife bails him out saying that Elango is not good. Viji relocates to Chennai and stays with Saro in her compound. Selvam's love with Leela is revealed to Manicakam and Saro, and they are happy. But things don't turn out well as Rajam threatens to commit suicide if Leela and Selvam marry, thus, Manickam forbids the idea. Leela's marriage is arranged with another man, but Rajam spoils it by spreading fake news about Leela. Saro manages to fix Leela's wedding with a small time businessman Ravi and both families agree. Leela tries to forget Selvam and starts to convince herself.

Gopikrishnan alias Gopi is a man who works in a garment. He gets his bag swapped with Saro's in a bank and goes to return it. He meets Viji and immediately falls in love with her, without knowing her actual name. When Selvam calls for Nirmala, Viji comes out instead and Gopi mistakes her to be Selvam's sister, Nirmala. Fallen in love, he brings his family to see 'Nirmala' but his family doesn't like her. Realizing its the wrong girl, Gopi creates much confusion, angering Rajam. But finally, his marriage is fixed with Viji.
Life goes on for all the daughters with their share of ups and downs
Dhanam delivers a daughter, Saro, a son, Leela, twin daughters, and Viji, a boy. Bhavani, moves to Singapore for her higher studies.
After 5 years the families become well settled and Manickam has been moved to a new house,Ravi gets cured,Bose and Gopi became business entrepreneurs.Finally Chidambaram dies in a car accident and Rajam became a good person and she helds the Bhavani and Murali's marriage and ends with a group photo

Cast

Main 
Delhi Kumar as Chidambaram, a land-broker
Kaveri as Dhanalakshmi "Dhanam", Chidambaram's eldest daughter and Bose's niece and wife
Gayathri Shastry as Saroja "Saro", Chidambaram's second daughter, Manikam's wife, and Natarajan's mother
Vanaja as Leelavathy "Leela", Chidambaram's third daughter and Ravi's wife
Uma Maheshwari as Vijayalakshmi "Viji/Vijaya", Chidambaram's fourth daughter, Gopi's wife, a nurse
Revathi Priya as Bhavani, Chidambaram's youngest daughter works in Singapore
J. Venkatesan "J. Venkat" (Bose Venkat) as Bose, Dhanam husband, Chidhambaram's brother-in-law, the former owner of a soda factory.
Chetan as Manikkam, Saro husband, Rajam Son, Selvam and Nirmala brother, a vegetable shop owner.
Raj Kanth as Ravichandran "Ravi", Leela husband, Sumathi Ex-husband, a TV shop owner.
Thirumurugan as Gopikrishnan "Gopi", Viji husband, a big sewing shop manager.

Recurring
Shanti Willams as Rajeshwari "Rajam", Manikkam, Selvam and Nirmala mother.
Shanthi as Shanthi
Vishwa as Selvam, Rajam second son, Manikam and Nirmala brother
Shanmugasundari as Kamatchi (House owner patti)
Rindhya/Aruna Devi as Nirmala, Rajam's sole daughter, Santhosh's ex-wife
V. Thiruselvam as a bank officer/Gnanaraj (Santosh), ex-husband of Nirmala
Sai Nathan (Bombay Babu/Kaveri Babu) as Sivasamy, former boss of Manikkam
Vinayak "Vinay" as Ramesh, son of former boss of Manikkam
Krithika as Arundhathi, ex-wife of Selvam 
Sanjeev as Ilango
Neelima Rani as Sakthi
Sindhu as Sarala, Manikkam's former mistress
Ramachandran as Ramachandran, Sarala's husband
Sampathkumaran Sridharan (Auditor Sridhar) as Sundaram, Saro's uncle
V. C. Jeyamani as Jeyamani, Ravi's father
Ushapriya (K. Priya) as Meenatchi, Ravi's mother
Gayathri Priya as Sumathi, Ravi's first wife
Vietnam Veedu Sundaram as Kathiresan, Gopi's father
Y. V. Subramaniam as Sumathi's father
Rangathurai (Rajaguru) as Lakshmanan, Gopi maternal uncle/elder brother-in-law
Vijaya Raj as Sivaraman, Gopi younger brother-in-law
Latha Rao as Kavitha, Gopi's younger sister
Karnan as Kumar, Gopi's brother
N. Bhuvaneshwari (Bhuvana) as Eeswari, Gopi's elder sister
Hema as Raji
Geetha Ravishankar as Lakshmi
Soundhar as Ponraj
Sai Madhavi as Narmadha, Saro and Manikkam's neighbour, Meena's sister. Her mother runs Mess
Deepa Shankar as Meena, Saro and Manikkam's neighbour, Narmadha's sister. Her mother runs Mess
Varshini as Malliga, Narmadha and Meena's younger sister
Rani as Ramya, Saro and Manickam's neighbour
Mousmiya/Latha Shalini as Radha
Ashok Samuel as Radha's husband
Sai Deepika as Sivasamy's wife
Sukumaran Sairam as Shiva
Nellai Sarathy as house owner thatha
Subbulakshmi as house owner patti
Sujatha Logesh as Gopi's colleague/staff
Aranthangi Shankar as a bank manager
B. Muralikrishnan as Ramesh's friend
G. Danush as Ramesh's friend
Jayaprakasam as Amarnath
Ramnaath as Kamatchi's son
R. M. Palaniappan as Balasubramanian, Arundhathi's father
Anjalidevi as Deivanai, Arundhathi's mother
C. N. Ravishankar as Sundar, Vasu's friend
S. Gokulthilak as Gokul, Ilango's friend
Rajkumar as Mayilravanan (Murali)
Viji Kannan as Harsha's mother
Azhagu as Sakthi's father
Thozhar. La. Ve. Aadhavan as Sakthi's father's creditor
Black Pandi as a boy working in the market/room boy
G. V. Vijesh as Nirmala's neighbour
Julie as Vinodhini
Amitha as Elizabeth
Veera Srinivasan (K. Veera) as a lorry company owner
R. Selvakumar as Chidambaram's customer
J. Lalitha as Nirmala's neighbour
Ramdoss as a garment worker
T. Sivakumar (Soodhu Kavvum Sivakumar) as Leela's colleague 
Kadugu Ramamoorthy as a marriage broker
Chelladurai as a garment owner
Kovai Senthil as a remedist 
Udhay as a photographer
Aparna as a TV host
Nathan Shyam as David's friend
Balasubramanian (Bala Subramani/K. Balu) as a driver
Venkatakrishnan as a lodge owner
Sregajesh as a lodge guest
Giridhar Thirumalachary as Arundhathi and David's professor
Raja Rani Pandian as hardware store owner
Vaazha Meen Muthuraj as a boy working in the rice warehouse
Soundarya as Mala
Mythili as Jaya and Meena's teacher
E. R. Malliga as a flower vendor
Usha Elizabeth Suraj as a textile shop customer
Swaminathan as a Raji's uncle
C. Rajaappasamy as Madhusudhanan
Jayakanthan as a police inspector
P. S. Vijaya Kumar as worker in the market
Vijay Ganesh as Aarumugam
E. Vikkiramathithan as Pazhani
Baskar Sakthi as Kasirajan's lodge manager
Livingston in a special appearance as himself
Rambha in a special appearance as herself
Vijayalakshmi in a special appearance as herself
Indhu in a special appearance as herself
Lavanya in a special appearance as herself
Arunasri in a special appearance as herself
Poorvaja (Karishma/Archana) as in a special appearance as herself
Ramesh Khanna as in a special appearance as himself
Vaiyapuri in a special appearance as himself
Suraj in a special appearance as himself

Production

Filming
The series was filmed in Chennai, Papanasam, Palani, Courtallam, Kanchipuram, Kodaikanal, Oddanchatram, Nerkundram, Gerugambakkam, Kovur, Porur, Kolapakkam, Mudichur, Valasaravakkam, Ramapuram, Muttukadu, Parangimalai, Devipattinam, Puducherry and Mumbai in India. The series was also shot in Singapore.

Airing history

Initially the series was aired on 7:30pm on all weekdays due to high TRP ratings the series shifted to 9pm from November 2003.Later the series again shifted to 7:30pm from February 2005

Soundtrack

Adaptations

Reception

Awards
The Metti Oli team won several awards, including the Kalaimamani from the Tamil Nadu State Government.

Ratings
Metti Oli was one of the highest-rated Indian and Tamil soap opera in its run time which garnered ratings ranging between 23 and 26 TVR. It garnered a peak rating of 50.3 points overall in its runtime. The final episode garnered 45 TVR for Sun TV.

In 2008, the series was later re-telecasted in Sun TV. In 2018, it was re-telecasted in Moon. In 2020, it's rerun in Sun TV during COVID-19 pandemic, the series became one of the most watched Tamil television program. It garnered 4.004 and 4.934 million impressions during week 12 and 13 of 2020.

Critics
Hindustan Times described Metti Oli as "highly melodramatic" in a review asking for more CID and crime drama instead to be broadcast.

See also
 List of programs broadcast by Sun TV

References

External links
 Official Website 
 Sun TV on YouTube
 Sun TV Network 
 Sun Group 
 

Sun TV original programming
Tamil-language television shows
2002 Tamil-language television series debuts
2005 Tamil-language television series endings